Starci na chmelu is a 1964 Czechoslovak film directed by Ladislav Rychman. The film starred Josef Kemr.

References

External links
 

1964 films
1960s Czech-language films
Czech musical films
Czechoslovak musical films
1960s Czech films